John Damian Androcles Aspinall (born 24 May 1960) is an English businessman and conservationist. He has raised and released a number of zoo-bred lowland gorillas in Gabon.

Early life
Aspinall is the son of Jane Gordon Hastings and John Victor Aspinall who was a casino and zoo owner, founder of Aspinall's, conservationist, and the stepson of Sir George Osborne, 16th Baronet. Aspinall's step-mother is Lady Sarah Aspinall. In 1972, his father married Lady Sarah "Sally" Courage, widow of the racing driver Piers Courage and daughter of Francis Curzon, 5th Earl Howe. From the age of six, Aspinall was educated as a boarder at Millfield in Somerset.

Career
Aspinall's wealth is estimated to be around £200m. After his father's death in 2000, Damian bought back the family casino interests with the help of Australian associate James Packer, son of Kerry Packer.

He runs the John Aspinall Foundation founded by his father, and his stated goal is to breed gorillas and return them to the wild. He manages Howletts Wild Animal Park and nearby Port Lympne Wild Animal Park, where at least 120 gorillas have been born.

Successes 
Kwibi, the celebrity gorilla released when five years old in 2005 in Gabon, had been born and raised at Howletts, a wild animal park in Kent. Aspinall tracked Kwibi in 2010 and the video of the reunion became widely viewed on YouTube.

Since 2008, Aspinall has spearheaded conservation efforts to save the critically endangered greater bamboo lemur. The estimated population size of the greater bamboo lemur has risen since 2009 from 100 to 1,000 individuals. Thanks to the work of Aspinall's charitable foundation and partners, the greater bamboo lemur was removed from the list of 25 most threatened primates in the world.

Aspinall started the Javan Primate Project in 2012 and has since released more than 135 primates including Javan langurs, moloch gibbons and grizzled leaf monkeys into protected sites in Java. The animals are a mix of those rescued from the local illegal pet trade and rewilded from Aspinall's two UK wildlife parks.

In October 2019, Aspinall – alongside an international team of conservationists – rescued 11 elephants, 4 giraffe, 19 buffalo and 29 wildebeest from Blaauwbosch in South Africa's Eastern Cape after a sustained period of drought and neglect at a mismanaged game reserve.

In February 2020, The Aspinall Foundation, of which Damian Aspinall is chairman, became the first organisation in the world to send captive bred cheetahs from the UK for rewilding in South Africa. Aspinall personally released the two male cheetahs, who were born at Port Lympne, into their new home close to Cape Town.

Controversy 
A BBC report in 2014 stated that the facility said that it had "successfully reintroduced more than 50 gorillas back into the wild since 1996" and that the Aspinall Foundation managed two gorilla rescue and rehabilitation projects in Gabon and Congo, respectively. In fact, Aspinall had purchased about a million acres in Africa and turned the area into a park in an attempt to protect gorillas whose numbers have been reducing due to the loss of habitat and poaching. Gorillas from his Port Lympne animal park were being sent to this area. 

Aspinall has said he would like to close all zoos and send the captive animals into the wild. Over the years however, not all of the gorillas introduced into Africa survived, possibly due to having been primed to humans and being unable to care for themselves in the wild and attacks by other gorillas. One report in 2014 stated that a family of ten zoo-born silverback gorillas were sent to Gabon and at least five were killed, an outcome many had predicted.

In a 2016 interview, Aspinall blamed one gorilla that the Foundation had released for killing the five others in 2014. He also criticized the negative publicity about the event stating, "What about the 60 we released that survived? There's no glory if you get it right. We get no press, no publicity – but boy, if anything goes wrong, they jump on you."

Personal life
Aspinall was married to Louise Elizabeth Julia Sebag-Montefiore for 15 years. Louise is the mother of two of Aspinall's daughters; Tansy (1989) and Clary (1992). After his divorce from Louise, Aspinall dated Kirsty Bertarelli and Donna Air, the mother of his third daughter, Freya Air Aspinall (2003). In 2016, Aspinall married the then 29 year old Victoria Fisher.

References

External links
 The Aspinall Foundation

1960 births
Living people
Businesspeople in the casino industry
English conservationists
British real estate businesspeople
People educated at Millfield
Zoo owners